Joseph Killackey (January 21, 1879 – September 8, 1946) was an American sailor serving in the United States Navy during the Boxer Rebellion who received the Medal of Honor for bravery.

Biography

Killackey was born January 21, 1879, in Cork County, Ireland, and after entering the navy he was sent as a Landsman to China to fight in the Boxer Rebellion.

He died September 8, 1946, and is buried at Mount Moriah Cemetery in Philadelphia, Pennsylvania. His grave can be found in the naval asylum plot.

Medal of Honor citation
Rank and organization: Landsman, U.S. Navy. Born: 21 January 1879, Cork County, Ireland. Accredited to: Pennsylvania. G.O. No.: 55, 19 July 1901.

Citation:

In action with the relief expedition of the Allied forces in China, 13, 20, 21 and 22 June 1900. During this period and in the presence of the enemy, Killackey distinguished himself by meritorious conduct.

See also

List of Medal of Honor recipients
List of Medal of Honor recipients for the Boxer Rebellion

References
Inline

General

1879 births
1946 deaths
19th-century Irish people
Irish sailors in the United States Navy
United States Navy Medal of Honor recipients
United States Navy sailors
American military personnel of the Boxer Rebellion
Irish-born Medal of Honor recipients
People from County Cork
Boxer Rebellion recipients of the Medal of Honor
Burials at Mount Moriah Cemetery (Philadelphia)